Guignardia camelliae is a plant pathogen infecting tea.

See also
 List of tea diseases

References

External links

Fungal plant pathogens and diseases
Tea diseases
Botryosphaeriaceae
Fungi described in 1923